Copping is a surname. Notable people with the surname include:

 Alice Copping (1906–1996), New Zealand nutritionist
 Barbara Copping (born 1944), Canadian politician
 Benet Copping (born 1986), Australian rules footballer
 Bobby Copping (born 2001), English footballer
 Cecil Copping (1888–1966), American composer 
 Chris Copping (born 1945), English musician and singer-songwriter
 Harold Copping (1863–1932), British artist
 Jason Copping (born 1976), Canadian politician
 John Copping (died 1743), Irish clergyman
 Martin Copping (born 1977), Australian actor
 Robin Copping (born 1934), Australian cinematographer and producer
 Stephen Copping (born 1956), Australian footballer
 Wilf Copping (1909–1980), English footballer

See also
 Copping, Tasmania
 Copping Hall, historic building in East Sussex, England
 Rogerus Coppyng (fl. 1300s), English politician